"Life of the Party" is the debut single recorded by Canadian singer Shawn Mendes from his extended play (EP) The Shawn Mendes EP and debut studio album Handwritten (2015). Written by Ido Zmishlany and Scott Harris, it was recorded in Toronto, Ontario and released on June 26, 2014.

Music video
A lyric video, released on July 1, 2014, is a long, one-shot zoom-in on Mendes in The George Street Diner in Toronto, who occasionally converses with the waitress of the diner as he is singing. Lyrics from the song appear in spots such as tables and hanging lights. It ends with the waitress reading a note left from Shawn, smiling as the scene fades. The official video was released on March 26, 2014.

Background
The title of the song, "Life of the Party", may give the impression that it's an upbeat dance song, but in an interview, Mendes described the song as not "super happy, but it's also not depressing". The lyrics represent being happy with yourself and figuring out who you are and who you want to be. It was written by two writers from New York, Ido Zmishlany and Scott Harris, though Mendes felt a strong connection to it.

Chart performance
The song debuted on the Billboard Hot 100 chart of July 12, 2014, at number 24, making it his first entry in the chart and first top 40 hit. The song debuted at number five on the Hot Digital Songs chart with 148,000 downloads.

Charts

Weekly charts

Year-end charts

Certifications

References

2014 debut singles
2014 songs
Pop ballads
Shawn Mendes songs
Songs written by Scott Harris (songwriter)
Island Records singles
Songs written by Ido Zmishlany